Stanisław Kłosowicz (4 March 1903 – 16 October 1955) was a Polish cyclist. He competed in the individual and team road race events at the 1928 Summer Olympics.

References

External links
 

1903 births
1955 deaths
Sportspeople from Krasnoyarsk
People from the Russian Empire of Polish descent
Polish male cyclists
Olympic cyclists of Poland
Cyclists at the 1928 Summer Olympics
20th-century Polish people